Donata Rimšaitė (born 29 January 1988) is a Russian-Lithuanian modern pentathlete. She represented Lithuania at the 2008 Summer Olympics in Beijing. She won a silver medal at the 2010 Modern Pentathlon World Cup in Medway. In 2011, Rimšaitė began competing for Russia. She won a gold medal in the mixed relay at the 2016 World Championships in Moscow.

Awards
 Knight's Cross Order for Merits to Lithuania (22 September 2010)
 Best Russian women's modern pentathlist (2013)

References

External links
 
 Donata RIMSAITE at Pentathlon.org

1988 births
Living people
Sportspeople from Vilnius
Lithuanian female modern pentathletes
Lithuanian emigrants to Russia
Naturalised citizens of Russia
Russian female modern pentathletes
Modern pentathletes at the 2008 Summer Olympics
Olympic modern pentathletes of Lithuania
World Modern Pentathlon Championships medalists
Modern pentathletes at the 2016 Summer Olympics
Olympic modern pentathletes of Russia